Pulaksagar is a Digambara Jain Monk.

Life
Pulaksagar is a Digambara monk who was initiated by Acharya Pushpadantsagar. He supports Jain religious ritual of Sallekhana.

He gave his sermon in Ajmer, Rajasthan on 29 August 2015 highlighting the ill-effects of addiction.

References

1970 births
Living people
Indian Jain monks
21st-century Indian Jains
21st-century Jain monks
21st-century Indian monks